The 1972 Five Nations Championship was the 43rd Five Nations Championship, an annual rugby union competition contested by the men's national teams of England, France, Ireland, Scotland and Wales, and the 78th since it began as the Home Nations Championship.

For the first time since the Second World War, the championship was not completed. Scotland and Wales did not travel to Dublin to play Ireland because of escalating political tensions in the wake of Bloody Sunday. Although the remaining fixtures of the schedule were fulfilled, as both Ireland and Wales won all their matches, neither could claim the title. To fill the gap of the missing two fixtures, France played a friendly match in Dublin (in addition to the scheduled match in Paris). In total, nine matches were played between 15 January and 29 April 1972.

This was the first Five Nations Championship in which a try was worth four points.

This tournament saw France play its last matches at its decades-long home ground, Stade Yves-du-Manoir in Colombes. The opening of the rebuilt Parc des Princes that June saw France move its Five Nations matches to that ground.

Participants

Table

Squads

Fixtures

Friendly match

References

External links

The official RBS Six Nations Site
 http://stats.espnscrum.com/scrum/rugby/records/team/match_results.html?id=650;type=tournament

Six Nations Championship seasons
Five Nations
Five Nations
Five Nations
Five Nations
Five Nations
Five Nations
 
Five Nations
Five Nations
Five Nations
Five Nations